Brian Donnelly may refer to:

 Brian Donnelly (hurler) (born 1961), Irish retired hurler
 Brian Donnelly (New Zealand politician) (1949–2008), member of the New Zealand First party
 Brian Donnelly (British diplomat), retired United Kingdom diplomat
 Brian J. Donnelly (born 1946), U.S. Representative from Massachusetts, 1979–1993
 Bryan Donnelly (rower) (born 1975), Canadian Olympic rower
 Kaws (Brian Donnelly, born 1974), American artist and designer